Rajesh Chaudhary is an Indian politician who is serving as Member of 18th Uttar Pradesh Legislative Assembly from Mant Assembly. In 2022 Uttar Pradesh Legislative Assembly election, he won by eight time MLA Shyam Sunder Sharma. with 83,958 votes.

References 

Uttar Pradesh MLAs 2022–2027
Bharatiya Janata Party politicians from Uttar Pradesh
Year of birth missing (living people)
Living people